Guanoxan is a sympatholytic drug that was marketed as Envacar by Pfizer in the UK to treat high blood pressure. It was not widely used and was eventually withdrawn from the market due to liver toxicity.

References

Adrenergic release inhibitors
Benzodioxans
Guanidines
Hepatotoxins
Withdrawn drugs